Protector of the Horses could refer to:

A title given to Sun Wukong in the 16th-century Chinese novel Journey to the West. 
Epona, the Gallo-Roman goddess of horses